The Dirty Old Men (rereleased as Mr. Bechet) is an album by pianist Earl Hines and saxophonist Budd Johnson recorded in France in 1974 for the Black & Blue label.

Reception

The AllMusic review by Ken Dryden stated: "Budd Johnson didn't do much recording as a leader, so this French studio date is particularly valuable".

Track listing
 "Mr. Bechet" (Budd Johnson) - 4:34 Bonus track on CD reissue  
 "Blues for Sale" (Earl Hines, Budd Johnson) - 9:24  
 "Gone with the Wind" (Allie Wrubel, Herb Magidson) - 4:46  
 "If You Were Mine" (Matty Malneck, Johnny Mercer) - 4:42  
 "Am I Waisting My Time" (Irving Bibo, Howard Johnson) - 4:46  
 "The Dirty Old Man" (Budd Johnson) - 9:08  
 "Linger Awhile" (Harry Owens, Vincent Rose) - 5:59

Personnel 
Earl Hines - piano
Budd Johnson - tenor saxophone, soprano saxophone
Jimmy Leary - bass
Panama Francis - drums

References 

 

1974 albums
Earl Hines albums
Budd Johnson albums
Black & Blue Records albums